Ribs & Burgers is an Australian gourmet fast food restaurant chain founded in 2011 by Bradley Michael and Chad Rahme. The menu includes a range of classic-style burgers and other food items. which also owns other restaurants around Australia.

As of 2018, Ribs & Burgers has 17 restaurants around Australia - nine in New South Wales, four in Victoria, three in Queensland and two in Western Australia. They also have a restaurant in Teddington, UK, and one in Pretoria, South Africa.

In 2016, in response to a craze of ‘unusual’ burgers, Ribs & Burgers launched a ‘Mutant Burger’ - an electric blue-coloured burger.

References

External links
 

Fast casual restaurants
Hamburger restaurants
Barbecue restaurants
Restaurant chains in Australia